Michael Philip Murray (born 26 November 1949 in Perth, Australia) has been a Labor member of the Western Australian Legislative Assembly since February 2001. He represented the electorate of Collie from 2001 to 2005 and has represented the electorate of Collie-Preston since an electoral redistribution in 2005.

Growing up in the small town of Duranillin in the Shire of West Arthur, Murray attended the local primary school before moving to Collie with his parents and completing his education in local state schools. 
Murray completed his apprenticeship as a mechanic and worked in the North West of Western Australia before settling back in Collie to work in the coal mines.

Murray contested the seat of Collie twice before defeating the sitting member, Hilda Turnbull, in the 2001 election on a swing of 9.4 points and a two-party-preferred margin of 2.6 points. 
The electorate of Collie was abolished in 2003 to become Collie-Wellington and Murray retained the seat in 
2005 election with a comfortable majority of 9.3%.

While in Parliament, Murray has been a member of the Economics and Industry Standing Committee and Joint Standing Committee on Delegated Legislation committees. He has been a trustee of the Parliamentary superannuation fund from 2001 and a Deputy government whip from 2001 to 2005. He is the convenor of the Country Labor grouping within the Western Australian Labor Party.

References

1949 births
Living people
Members of the Western Australian Legislative Assembly
Australian Labor Party members of the Parliament of Western Australia
21st-century Australian politicians